Joaquín Andrés Irigoytía (born 15 August 1975 in Gualeguaychú, Entre Ríos, Argentina) is an Argentine professional footballer who played for clubs of the Argentina, Paraguay, Mexico and Spain.

Irigoytía began playing football in the youth system of Club Atlético River Plate. He retired after 11 seasons of playing professional football.

He won the Bronze Ball at the 1995 FIFA U-20 World Cup.

Clubs
 River Plate 1995–1997
 Hércules 1998
 River Plate 1995–1997
 Colón 1999–2002
 Cerro Porteño 2003
 Club de Fútbol Cobras 2003
 Club Almagro 2004
 Lanús 2005
 Aldosivi 2006

References

External links
 
 

1975 births
Living people
Argentine footballers
Association football goalkeepers
Argentina youth international footballers
Argentina under-20 international footballers
Club Atlético River Plate footballers
Hércules CF players
Club Atlético Colón footballers
Cerro Porteño players
Club de Fútbol Cobras players
Club Almagro players
Club Atlético Lanús footballers
Aldosivi footballers
Argentine expatriate footballers
Argentine expatriate sportspeople in Spain
Expatriate footballers in Spain
Argentine expatriate sportspeople in Mexico
Expatriate footballers in Mexico
Argentine expatriate sportspeople in Paraguay
Expatriate footballers in Paraguay
Sportspeople from Entre Ríos Province